Ultimate Hits may refer to:

Albums
Ultimate Hits (Lee Kernaghan album), 2011
Ultimate Hits (Steve Miller Band album), 2017
Ultimate Hits (Little River Band album), 2022
The Ultimate Hits (Garth Brooks album), 2007 
The Ultimate Hits Collection (Juice Newton album), 2011
The Ultimate Hits Collection (Johnny Mathis album), 1998
42 Ultimate Hits, compilation album by Kenny Rogers, 2004
Ultimate Hits: Rock and Roll Never Forgets, compilation album by Bob Seger
Double Dose: Ultimate Hits, Poison, 2011
I Told You So: The Ultimate Hits of Randy Travis, compilation album by Randy Travis, 2009

Games
Ultimate Hits (Square Enix), Square Enix budget ranges